John Pigdon (3 July 1832 – 24 October 1903) was mayor of Melbourne from 1881–82.

Pigdon was born in Longhorsley, Northumberland, England, and migrated to Australia in 1852, where he became a building contractor and businessman. He served on the Melbourne City Council from 1869 until 1903. Pigdon died in Bendigo, Victoria, Australia on 24 October 1903, aged 71.

References

1832 births
1903 deaths
English emigrants to Australia
Mayors and Lord Mayors of Melbourne
19th-century Australian politicians
People from Longhorsley